Various attempts have been made, under the British Raj and since, to classify the population of India according to a racial typology. After independence, in pursuance of the government's policy to discourage distinctions between communities based on race, the 1951 Census of India did away with racial classifications. Today, the national Census of independent India does not recognise any racial groups in India.

Some scholars of the colonial epoch attempted to find a method to classify the various groups of India according to the predominant racial theories popular at that time in Europe. This scheme of racial classification was used by the British census of India, which was often integrated with caste system considerations.

Great races

Scientific racism of the late 19th and early 20th centuries divided humans into three races based on "common physical characteristics": Caucasoid, Mongoloid, and Negroid.

American anthropologist Carleton S. Coon wrote that "India is the easternmost outpost of the Caucasian racial region" and defined the Indid race that occupies the Indian subcontinent as beginning in the Khyber Pass. John Montgomery Cooper, an American ethnologist and Roman Catholic priest, on 26 April 1945 in a hearing before the United States Senate "To Permit all people from India residing in the United States to be Naturalised" recorded:

The theory propounded by German comparative philologists in the 1840s and 1850s "maintained that the speakers of Indo-European languages in India, Persia, and Europe were of the same culture and race." This led to a distinction between the Indo-Aryan peoples of northern India and the Dravidian peoples, located mostly in southern India with pockets in the Baluchistan Province in the northwest and in the eastern corner of the Bihar Province.

Although anthropologists classify Dravidians as Caucasoid with the "Mediterranean-Caucasoid" type being the most predominant, the racial status of the Dravidians was initially disputed. In 1898, ethnographer Friedrich Ratzel remarked about the "Mongolian features" of Dravidians, resulting in what he described as his "hypothesis of their [Dravidians] close connection with the population of Tibet", whom he adds "Tibetans may be decidedly reckoned in the Mongol race". In 1899, Science summarised Ratzel's findings over India with,

Edgar Thurston named what he called Homo Dravida and described it close to Australoids, with Caucasoid (Indo-Aryan) admixture. As evidence, he adduced the use of the boomerang by Kallar and Maravar warriors and the proficiency at tree-climbing among both the Kadirs of the Anamalai hills and the Dayaks of Borneo. In 1900, anthropologist Joseph Deniker said,
 Deniker grouped Dravidians as a "subrace" under "Curly or Wavy Hair Dark Skin" in which he also includes the Ethiopian and Australian. Also, Deniker mentions that the "Indian race has its typical representatives among the Afghans, the Rajputs, the Brahmins and most of North India but it has undergone numerous alterations as a consequence with crosses with Assyriod, Dravidian, Mongol, Turkish, Arab and other elements."

In 1915, Arnold Wright said,

Wright also mentions that Richard Lydekker and Flowers classified Dravidians as Caucasian. Later, Carleton S. Coon, in his book The Races of Europe (1939), reaffirmed this assessment and classified the Dravidians as Caucasoid due to their "Caucasoid skull structure" and other physical traits such as noses, eyes and hair, and 20th century anthropologists classified Dravidians as Caucasoid with the "Mediterranean-Caucasoid" type being the most predominant.

Brahmans 
Brahmans were described as 'the oldest of the martial classes'. Brahmans were recruited by Indian Army in a different guise long before their sudden rediscovery by Claude Auchinleck as 'the oldest of the martial classes'. In the past having two of the oldest regiments, the 1st Brahmans and 3rd Brahmans.

See also
 Mongoloid race
 Brown people
 Asian people
 Ethnic groups of South Asia
 Indian people
 Caste system in India
 Genetics and archaeogenetics of South Asia
 mtDNA haplogroups in populations of South Asia
 Y-DNA haplogroups in populations of South Asia
 Eurasian (mixed ancestry)
 Anglo-Indian
 Afro-Asians
 Indo-African (disambiguation)
 Indian South Africans
 Afro-Asians in South Asia

References

India
British Empire
 
Indigenous peoples of South Asia
Scientific racism